Mildred /ˈmɪldɹəd/ is a female given name. It is an Anglo-Saxon name of Old English origin, composed of "mild" ("mild") + "þryð" ("power, strength", also present in the last syllable of the name Audrey), meaning "gentle strength". It reached the rank of the sixth most popular name for girls in the United States in 1912 and maintained that popularity through 1920, but then its popularity dropped quickly afterward. Familiar forms include Milly and Midge.

Notable people
People with the name Mildred include:

 Mildred Barber Abel (1902–1976), American politician
 Mildred Adams (1894–1980), American journalist
 Mildred Albert (1905–1991), American fashion show producer and radio and television personality
 Mildred Aldrich (1853–1928), American journalist
 Mildred Allen (physicist) (1894–1990), American physicist
 Mildred Allen (soprano) (1932–2021), American operatic soprano
 Mildred Ames (1919–1994), American writer
 Mildred Anderson, American singer
 Mildred Archer (1911–2005), English art historian
 Mildred Bailey (1907–1951), American jazz singer
 Mildred Inez Caroon Bailey (1919–2009), US Army office
 Mildred Barya (born 1976), Ugandan writer
 Mildred Blaxter (1925–2010), British sociologist
 Mildred Barnes Bliss (1879–1969), American art collector
 Mildred L. Batchelder (1901–1998), American librarian
 Mildred Bendall (1891–1977), French painter
 Mildred Benson (1905–2002), American author
 Mildred Edie Brady (1906–1965), American writer
 Mildred Brown (1905–1989), African American journalist
 Mildred Burke (1915–1989), American wrestler
 Mildred Anne Butler (1858–1941), Irish artist
 Mildred Buxton, Countess Buxton (1866–1955), English aristocrat
 Mildred Cable (1878–1952), British missionary
 Mildred Cleghorn (1910–1997), Apache tribe chairperson
 Mildred Clingerman (1918–1997), American writer
 Mildred Cohn (1913–2009), American biochemist
 Mildred Constantine (1913–2008), American curator
 Mildred Cooke (c.1525–1589), English noblewoman
 Mildred Couper (1887–1974), American musician
 Mildred Cram (1889–1985), American writer
 Mildred B. Davis, American novelist
 Mildred Davis (1901–1969), American actress
 Mildred Dover (born 1941), Canadian politician
 Mildred Dresselhaus (1930–2017), American professor
 Mildred Reason Dube (died 2022), Zimbabwean politician
 Mildred Dunnock (1901–1991), American actress
 Mildred Earp (1925–2017), American pitcher
 Mildred Adams Fenton (1899–1995), American scientific writer
 Mildred Fizzell (1915–1993), Canadian athlete
 Mildred Fox (born 1971), Irish politician
 Mildred Gale (1671–1701), grandmother of George Washington
 Mildred Barry Garvin (1929–1993), American politician 
 Mildred Gillars (1900–1988), American broadcaster
 Mildred Gordon (Ganas) (1922–2015), American activist
 Mildred Gordon (politician) (1923–2016), British politician
 Mildred Griffiths (1894–1949), American set decorator
 Mildred Grosberg Bellin (1908–2008), American cookbook author
 Mildred Harnack (1902–1943), American-German literary historian
 Mildred Harris (1901–1944), American film actress
 Mildred J. Hill (1859–1916), American songwriter
 Mildred Hilson, American socialite and philanthropist 
 Mildred Horn, American critic
 Mildred Barry Hughes (1902–1995), American politician
 Mildred "Millie" Jackson (born 1944), American singer and comedian
 Mildred Fay Jefferson (1926–2010), American physician
 Mildred Jeffrey (1910–2004), American activist
 Mildred Callahan Jones (1943–2008), American businesswoman
 Mildred Kornman (1925–2022), American actress
 Mildred Lager (1900–1960), American health food pioneer
 Mildred Childe Lee (1846–1905), American socialite
 Mildred Lillie (1915–2002), American judge
Mildred Maddocks (1881-1955), American cooking journalist and writer
 Mildred Maldonado (born 2001), Mexican rhythmic gymnast
 Mildred Mangxola (born 1944), South African singer
Mildred Esther Mathias (1906–1995), American botanist
 Mildred H. McAfee (1900–1994), American academic
 Mildred McDaniel (1933–2004), American athlete
 Mildred Methvin (born 1952), American judge
 Mildred Miller (born 1924), American classical mezzo-soprano
 Mildred Mottahedeh (1908–2000), porcelain collector
 Mildred Muis (born 1968), Dutch swimmer
 Mildred Natwick (1905–1994), American actress
 Mildred Noble (1921–2008), American writer
 Mildred O'Neill (1914–2003), widow of Tip O'Neil
 Mildred Ellen Orton (1911–2010), American businesswoman
 Mildred Pabón (born 1957), Puerto Rican jurist
 Mildred Parten Newhall (1902–1970), American sociologist
 Mildred Persinger (1918–2018), American activist
 Mildred Amelia Woodbine Pomare (1877–1971), New Zealand community leader
 Mildred Pope (1872–1956), English scholar
 Mildred Ratcliffe (1899–1988), English painter, commercial artist and calligrapher
 Mildred Riddelsdell (1913-2006), British civil servant
 Mildred Robbins Leet (1922–2011), American entrepreneur
 Mildred Ruiz-Sapp, American actress
 Mildred Sampson (born 1933), New Zealand long-distance runner
 Mildred Sanderson (1889–1914), American mathematician
 Mildred Savage (1919–2011), American author
 Mildred Scheel (1932–1985), German physician
 Mildred Schwab (1917–1999), American attorney
 Mildred Seeley (1918–2001), American doll collector
 Mildred Shay (1911–2005), American actress
 Mildred T. Stahlman (born 1922), American professor
 Mildred D. Taylor (born 1943), African American writer
 Mildred Thompson (1936–2003), African American artist
 Mildred Valley Thornton (1890–1967), Canadian painter
 Mildred Trotter (1899–1991), forensic anthropologist
 Mildred Trouillot (born 1963), American lawyer
 Mildred Veitch (1889–1971), American horticulturist
 Mildred Warwick (1922–2006), American athlete
 Mildred Weisenfeld (1921–1997), American philanthropist
 Mildred Wiley (1901–2000), American athlete
 Mildred Wolfe (1912–2009), American artist
 Mildred Bangs Wynkoop (1905–1997), American Nazarene minister

Fictional characters
Characters with the name Mildred include:

 Mildred Rogers, a character from Of Human Bondage
 Mildred Hubble (The Worst Witch), protagonist of Jill Murphy's series
 Mildred Huxtetter, character from The Muppet Show
 Mildred Keith, title character from the series written by Martha Finley
 Mildred Krebs, a character from Remington Steele
 Mildred Montag, a character from Fahrenheit 451
 Mildred Pierce, protagonist of the novel, movie, and miniseries of the same name
 Mildred Ratched, nurse and main antagonist of One Flew Over the Cuckoo's Nest
 Mildred Roper, a character in the British TV sitcoms  Man About the House and George and Mildred
 Mildred Wyeth, a character in the Deathlands series
 Mildred Avallone, a NPC in the Arcana Heart video game series
 Maneater Mildred, an NPC in the video game Dark Souls
 Mildred Hayes, the protagonist from the movie Three Billboards outside Ebbing, Missouri
 Mildred Stacey Andrews "Blaineley" O'Halloran, a character from Total Drama World Tour
 Mildred McCallister, a character from Summer Camp Island
 Mildred Lathbury, the narrator and main character in Excellent Women by Barbara Pym

As a surname
 Henry Mildred
 Henry Hay Mildred
Mother Mildred

See also

References

Given names
English feminine given names